NGC 6124 (also known as Caldwell 75) is an open cluster located 1,860 light years away in the constellation Scorpius. It was discovered by Abbe Lacaille in 1751 during his South African tour.

The cluster is large and bright, with about 125 stars visible.

References

External links
 
 NGC 6124 at Messier45
 

NGC 6124
NGC 6124
6124
075b
?